PrideFest St. Louis is an annual LGBT pride event in St. Louis, Missouri. The event is organized by Pride St. Louis, an LGBT non-profit organization in the Greater St. Louis area.

Overview 
PrideFest St. Louis began in 1980 as the St. Louis Gay and Lesbian Pride Celebration. The theme began as "Celebration of Lesbian and Gay Pride" in 1980 and 1981, and changes yearly. The event is held annually during the last full weekend of June

The 2017 event took place on June 23, with Cleve Jones as the parade's Grand Marshal.

The 2018 event took place on June 23 once again in Downtown Saint Louis, at Soldiers Memorial.  The theme was "Remember. Rise. Respect." Angelica Ross was Grand Marshal.

The 2019 event - They have taken down the STL city flag during Pride month and replaced it with the transgender and gay flag. The parade's Grand Marshal, Metro Trans Umbrella Group, resigned after the decision to ask police to not wear uniforms in the parade was reversed.

Due to the COVID-19 pandemic in the United States, 2020 celebrations were conducted virtually. Organizers originally planned for a live, in-person PrideFest in 2021 but again due to COVID-19 the live event was postponed until 2022.

History 

What became known as the St. Louis Lesbian & Gay Pride Celebration Committee began in 1979, but the first St. Louis Gay and Lesbian Pride Celebration did not occur until 1980. This event was sponsored by the Magnolia Committee – named for the street where the majority of the members lived and had their meetings. Their combined effort with a second organization resulted in a week's worth of activities held in April 1980. At the end of the week, hundreds gathered for "The Lesbians and Gays Walk for Charity", which went down Lindell Boulevard in the Central West End to Washington University's quadrangle. These two combined groups then became the St. Louis Lesbian & Gay Pride Celebration Committee.

At the same time, writer Jim Thomas invited representatives from organizations around town to a meeting to begin discussions for an annual celebration. It was to be held in June as a tribute to the Stonewall Riots which occurred the last weekend of June in 1969. Each participating organization, still able to keep their identity in individual events, would form a larger group – creating a greater whole. At the time, the celebration consisted of a picnic in the beginning of the week and a march at the end.

Thus began a tradition which is still strong today in St. Louis. June is now known as Gay and Lesbian Pride Month, and since the first PrideFest in 1981, the event has grown in size, attendance, and scope.

Festival

Location 
In the 1980s and 1990s, Pride was held in the Central West End and Forest Park. By the late 1990s, festivities were moved to Tower Grove Park.

In 2013, PrideFest and the annual parade moved to downtown St. Louis. It has since been held at Soldiers Memorial, with the support of local officials, LGBT organizations, and the City of Saint Louis.

Attendance

Parade 
The Pride Parade has served as a method for legislators and candidates to illustrate their support of the LGBT community. The parade also serves as a means to showcase the creative talents and service hundreds of LGBT-friendly businesses, non-profit organizations, and community groups, as they spread their message to all who attend.

When on South Grand, the parade started from South Grand Blvd and Utah Street, passing Arsenal Street to Tower Grove Park. The parade route is now along Market Street in Downtown St. Louis.

See also 

 LGBT culture in St. Louis
 LGBT rights in Missouri

References

External links 

 Pride St. Louis official site

LGBT in Missouri
Culture of St. Louis
Festivals in Missouri
Pride parades in the United States
PrideFest
1980 establishments in Missouri
LGBT culture in St. Louis